George Frederick Vincent (25 March 1855 – 30 November 1928) was an English  organist and composer.

Background

George Frederick Vincent was born in Houghton-le-Spring on 27 March 1855, son of Charles John Vincent, organist, and educated at the Leipzig Conservatoire. He became organist of Holy Trinity Church, Sunderland, 1872–1874, then Whitburn Parish Church, 1878–1882, then St. Thomas' Church, Sunderland, 1882–1900. In 1900 he was appointed to St Michael, Cornhill.

He was a composer of operettas, cantatas, piano and organ music.

He died in Brentwood, on 30 November 1928.

Career

References

People from Houghton-le-Spring
Musicians from Tyne and Wear
English organists
British male organists
English composers
University of Music and Theatre Leipzig alumni
1855 births
1928 deaths